Aurélie Marie Elisa Allet (born 1 July 1997) is a Mauritian badminton player. She was the mixed doubles gold medalists at the 2013 African Junior Championships and 2014 African Youth Games. She competed at the 2018 Commonwealth Games in Gold Coast, and in June 2018, Allet won her first senior international title at the Mauritius International tournament in the mixed doubles event with Julien Paul. Allet competed at the 2019 African Games, and won a bronze medal in the mixed doubles event.

Personal life 
Allet was proposed by her Australian boyfriend Justin Serret after she finished her round one win in Gold Coast 2018.

Achievements

African Games 
Mixed doubles

African Youth Games 
Girls' doubles

Mixed doubles

African Junior Championships 
Girls' doubles

Mixed doubles

BWF International Challenge/Series 
Women's singles

Women's doubles

Mixed doubles

  BWF International Challenge tournament
  BWF International Series tournament
  BWF Future Series tournament

References

External links 
 

1997 births
Living people
People from Plaines Wilhems District
Mauritian female badminton players
Badminton players at the 2018 Commonwealth Games
Commonwealth Games competitors for Mauritius
Competitors at the 2019 African Games
African Games bronze medalists for Mauritius
African Games medalists in badminton